Atmakur is a village in Suryapet district of the Indian state of Telangana. It is located in Athmakur (S) mandal of Suryapet division.

References

Villages in Suryapet district
Mandal headquarters in Suryapet district